Rodney Green may refer to:

 Rodney Green (athlete) (born 1985), Bahamian sprinter 
 Rodney Green (cyclist) (born 1974), South African cyclist
 Rodney Green (footballer) (1939–2018), English footballer
 Rodney Green (musician) (born 1979), American jazz drummer, see :de:Rodney Green (Musiker)